The Princes Highway may refer to:
Princes Highway, the Australian highway that joins Sydney to Port Augusta, via Melbourne.
Princes Freeway, the subsection of the road, between Traralgon in the east, through Melbourne, to Geelong in the west.
Old Princes Highway, Victoria, a former subsection of the road, between Traralgon in the east to Berwick in the west.
Princes Motorway, the subsection of the road, between the southern suburbs of Sydney to the southern perimeter of the Wollongong region.